

Arizona Diamondbacks

The D-backs - Short version of "Diamondbacks".
The Snakes - Reference to diamondback rattlesnakes.                                                                                
The Rattlesnakes - Long version of the previous.
The Diamondback Rattlesnakes - Longer version, referencing the full name of rattlesnake species.

Atlanta Braves

The Bravos - Variation of "Braves".
America's Team - Reference to the Braves games being broadcast nationwide.
The Barves - Another variation of "Braves".
Braves Country - Avid followers found primarily throughout the Southeast.
Georgia Braves - Referring that the team is located in Georgia.
 The Cowards - opposite of Braves; used derisively
The Peach Clobbers - Nickname of the hard-hitting 2013 Atlanta Braves team.

Baltimore Orioles
The O's - Short version of "Orioles". Fans usually loudly shout the "Oh" at the beginning of the seventh line of the National Anthem in unison.
The Birds - Reference to orioles, which are birds.
The Orange Birds - Reference to male orioles, which are orange birds.
The Oreos - Homophone of "Orioles", used particularly among older fans.

Boston Red Sox

The BoSox - Combination of "Boston" and "Sox". Coined by media to distinguish from the Chicago White Sox, or "ChiSox".
The Sox - Short version of "Red Sox".
The Sawx - In imitation of the Boston accent.
The Crimson Hose - A variation of "Red Sox".
The Olde Towne Team
The Carmines - A type of red pigment, the nickname is used often by former Red Sox player and retired White Sox broadcaster Ken Harrelson.
Red Sox Nation - Avid followers.
The Nation - Short version of "Red Sox Nation".
 The Cardiac Kids - 1967 team nickname.
 The Red Sux - Used by detractors, particularly by fans of the NY Yankees.
 The Dead Sox - Reference to Game 7 loss in 2003 ALCS to the Yankees.

Chicago Cubs

The Cubbies - Familiar version of "Cubs".
The Baby Bears - Referring to the meaning of cubs.
The Little Bears - Referring to the meaning of cubs.
The Blue Bears - Referring to the color of bear in its team logo.
Go Cubs Go - An official team and victory song written by Steve Goodman in 1984 that becomes popular when Cubs are having success.
The Loveable Losers - Reference to team's ability to maintain a loyal fan base despite decades of failure to win the pennant.
The Northsiders - To differentiate from the South Side residing White Sox.
The Northside Nine - Same as the previous.
The Flubs - Referring to the Cubs team when failing expectations.
The Boys of Zimmer - Refers to the NL East division-winning 1989 team managed by Don Zimmer and the 1972 book, The Boys of Summer by Roger Kahn.
The Big Blue Train
Chicago Orphans- Cap Anson was the first player credited with 3,000 hits.  In 1897 he was released as player/manager after 22 seasons with the club.  After his departure they became known as the Orphans.

Chicago White Sox

The Sox - Short version of "White Sox".
The ChiSox - Combination of "Chicago" and "Sox". Coined by media to distinguish from the Boston Red Sox, or "BoSox".
The Southsiders - To differentiate from the North Side residing Cubs.
The Pale Hose - Variation of "White Sox".
The Black and White - Reference to the team's colors
The Hitless Wonders - Refers to the 1906 team that won the AL pennant and World Series despite a .230 team batting average.
The Black Sox - Reference to the infamous 1919 team, which fixed the World Series and is popularly known as the "Black Sox Scandal".
The Go-Go Sox - Refers to the 1959 AL championship team
The South Side Hitmen - Refers to the high-slugging 1977 team

Cincinnati Reds

The Big Red Machine - Reference to the 1970s teams that won six divisional titles, four pennants and two World Series titles.
The Redlegs - Temporary team name to differentiate from Communists during the Red Scare, who were also referred to as "Reds".
The Nasty Boys - Refers to the bullpen team of Rob Dibble, Norm Charlton, and Randy Myers who led the 1990 Reds to a World Series sweep.

Cleveland Guardians

The Guards - Shortened version of "Guardians".
Guardiac Kids - A play on Kardiac Kids, a beloved nickname of the local football team (Cleveland Browns). Also, alluding to the youngest player roster in all of MLB and AAA (26 years) during the 2022 inaugural season with the new name, Guardians.
The Tribe - Tribes are social structures among American Indigenous people.
Chief Wahoo's Tribe - Reference to the team's former logo, an Indigenous person called "Chief Wahoo".
The Wahoos - Same as the previous.
The Fighting Braves of the Cuyahoga and The Sons of Geronimo - Nicknames made famous by fictitious announcer Harry Doyle (Bob Uecker) in the 1989 film Major League.
The Windians - Reference to the team that wins a lot, especially the 22-game winning streak in 2017. The number of W's before 'Indians' represents how many games the Indians won in a row.
The Injuns - Used by detractors. 
The Erie Warriors

Colorado Rockies

The Rocks - Short version of "Rockies".
The Rox - Homophone of "Rocks". Imitation of the names of the Red Sox and White Sox.
The Blake Street Bombers - Reference to the street Coors Field is on.
The Blake Street Bullies - Same as the previous.
Todd and the Toddlers - Reference to when Todd Helton was a veteran player surrounded by a team full of rookies and young players after the team management decided to focus their efforts on getting new players by bringing them up through their own farm system.

Detroit Tigers

The Cats - Reference to tiger being in the cat family. 
The Motor City Kitties - Referring solely to the 2003 season, which finished at 43–119.
The Kitties - Short version of the previous.
The Tabbies - Playful feline variation.
The Tiggs - Short version of "Tigers".
The Declawed Tigers - Reference to their 12 consecutive losing seasons from 1994 to 2005.
The Pussies or Pussys - Used by detractors, mainly White Sox and Twins fans.
The Pussy Cats - Same as the previous.
Motor City Bengals
The Bengals - Reference to Bengal tigers, a species of tiger.
The Bengal Tigers - Long version of the previous.
The/Los Tigres - Playful Spanish variation, often used with English definite article "The" instead of the Spanish "Los".
The Bless You Boys - Reference to the World Series championship team of 1984 and teams from surrounding years.

Houston Astros

Stros - Short version of "Astros".
Crush City - Reference to the 2015 team that led the league in home runs.
The Stars - Reference to the team logo.
The Astronauts - Long version of "Astros". To honor astronauts that occasionally come to the ballpark.
The Blastros - Reference to having a lot of home run pop in the lineup since 2015.
The Astronomicals - From Cincinnati Reds radio broadcaster Marty Brennaman.
8th Wonder of the World - Homage to the team's former stadium The Astrodome. The world's first multi-purpose, domed sports stadium.

Kansas City Royals

The Boys in Blue - Reference to one of the team's colors. Not commonly used, except in marketing.
The Comeback Kids - Reference to the young Royals team winning eight postseason games via comeback en route to their 2015 World Series title.
The Crowns - Reference to the crown in the team logo, and at the top of the large video board at Kauffman Stadium.
The Monarchs - Reference to the former Negro league team in Kansas City. Also a related term for royal.
The 'Yals - Abbreviation of Royals, used particularly among younger fans.
The Forever Royals - Referencing the core players Eric Hosmer, Mike Moustakas, Lorenzo Cain, and Alcides Escobar that helped them win the 2015 World Series where those players will forever be in the hearts of Royals fans.

Los Angeles Angels

The Halos - Reference to the halo of an angel (the halo is featured on the large "A" outside the stadium and was once a prominent part of the team logo).
The Anaheim Angels - Former regular nickname from 1997 to 2004; reference to the fact that the Angels are not from Los Angeles County, but the Orange County city of Anaheim.
Los Angeles Angels of Anaheim - Former regular nickname from 2005 to 2015; The team went by this to fulfill a contractual obligation to the City of Anaheim. 
The Angels Angels of Anaheim - Spanish "Los Angeles" translated to English 
Los Angelinos - Name in Spanish.  Reference to the large Hispanic population of Orange County.
California Angels

Los Angeles Dodgers

The Blue Crew - Reference to one of the team's colors.
The Boys in Blue - Another reference to the team's primary color.
Bleeding Dodger Blue - Avid fans.
Dem Bums - From the Brooklyn years. Reference from the team's problems during the era getting a world championship. Originally derogatory, Dodgers fans later adopted it as a term of affection.
The Boys of Summer - From the Brooklyn years - Reference to baseball being the only major team sport played during the summer. As with "Dem Bums", usage of this nickname for the Dodgers has faded with time; "Boys of Summer" is now often used to refer to baseball players in general.
The Azul- Spanish word for blue
The Lords of Flatbush - A nickname of the Dodgers when they were in Brooklyn.
The Trolley Dodgers - A nickname of the Dodgers when they were in Brooklyn. This was the name of the team before it was shortened to "Dodgers" in the 1930s.
The Evil Empire of the West - Used by detractors. A reference to the Yankees and the Dodgers ballooning team salary of 2013.
The Yankees of the West - The expectancy that the Dodgers will be like Yankees on the other coast in terms of expectancies and payroll.
The Yankees of Baseball - A butchering of the above name, famously said by former baseball player and ESPN color commentator Alex Rodriguez during a Dodgers-Mets game in 2021.

Miami Marlins

The Fish - Reference to marlins, which are fish.
The Fightin' Fish - Long version of the previous.
The Miracle Marlins - In reference to winning two World Series titles in two playoff appearances despite never winning a division title.
The Fins - Reference to the fins of a marlin. Also a nickname of the NFL's Miami Dolphins, who had shared a facility with the Marlins.

Milwaukee Brewers

The Brew Crew - Short version of the formal name.
The Crew - Short version of the previous.
The True Blue Brew Crew - A name consisting of a short version of "Brewers" and words that rhyme with it.
The Beermakers - Play on official name.
The Brew-Hahs - An ESPN invention (as in "brouhaha").
Harvey's Wallbangers - Refers to the AL pennant-winning 1982 team managed by Harvey Kuenn.
The Home of a Prince - Refers to when Prince Fielder played first base for the Brewers.
The/Los Cerveceros - Spanish translation of Brewers, used on uniforms for annual Cerveceros Day Hispanic heritage game.
The Creamers-For their color of cream and their power to destroy teams.

Minnesota Twins

The Bomba Squad - Self-dubbed by star left fielder Eddie Rosario in 2019, when then team broke the MLB record for most HRs prior to the All Star break.
BombaSota - A derivative of the above.
The Minnesota Lumber Company - Reference to the Twins' prodigious offense in the 1977 and 78 seasons
The Nats - Shortened form of the team's former nickname (Nationals) when they were in Washington. Continued in use after 1954, when the team's name was officially changed to the Senators. Discontinued after the team moved to Minnesota.
Piranhas - Reference to their aggressive "small ball" style of play, coined by rival Chicago White Sox manager Ozzie Guillén. Coined during the 2004 season, continued into 2005, used sporadically through the remainder of the 2000s decade. No longer in use.
The Twinkies - Familiar version of "Twins". Also a popular snack cake. Officially deprecated by the team, heavily used in seasons where the team is doing poorly.
The T_s - A detractor nickname referencing the Twins' playoff game losing streak which currently at 18 consecutive games.

Montreal Expos

The 'Spos - Short version of "Expos"
Les Expos - French translation of The Expos
Nos Amours - French translation meaning "Our Loves".

New York Mets
 The Metropolitans - Reference to the 19th-century New York baseball club (New York Metropolitans) and the source of the "Mets" name. Noted New York radio personality Steve Somers of WFAN commonly refers to the present-day Mets as the "Metropolitans."
 The Metsies - Affectionate term used by fans and Mets broadcasters alike.
 The Amazin' Mets - A reference to the Mets 1969 championship season, first coined by Casey Stengel.
 The Amazin's - Short version of the previous; more commonly used.
 The Orange and Blue - The team colors used in the song Meet the Mets.
 The Kings of Queens - Reference to the team's home, the New York City borough of Queens.
 The Miracle Mets - From 1969, the year when the Mets went from losing club to world champions.
 The Mets Machine - A reference to the 1969 Mets.
 The Loveable Losers - From the 1960s. Reference to the team's mediocrity in its early years.
 The Magical Mystery Mets - A reference to the 1969 Mets.
 The Bad Guys - A reference to the 1986  Mets, who were known for their high level of performance, hard-living lifestyles, and conflicts with each other and other teams on and off the field. Jeff Pearlman wrote a book about this team titled The Bad Guys Won.
 The Methodical Mets - Coined by baseball writer Tracy Ringolsby of the 1986 Mets.
 The Locomotives - A reference to the 1986 Mets.
 The Dominating Mets - A reference to the 1986 Mets.
 Fall-Short Mets - A reference to the 1989 Mets, who led in the season standings all summer, slumped during the final two weeks of the season allowing the Chicago Cubs to pass them in the standings.
 Los Mets - Reference to the large number of Hispanic players compiled by Omar Minaya during his tenure as general manager from 2004 to 2010.
LOLMets - Internet reference to the comical ineptitude of some Mets teams, especially the 2007 Mets.
 My Entire Team Sucks - Derisive acronym.
 Most Exciting Team in Sports - Acronym used by fans to derail the previous derisive acronym.
 The Other New York Team - The other being the more tenured New York Yankees.
 Pondscum - Used by detractors, mainly by Cardinals fans in 1987.
 The Mutts - Used by fans as an endearment. Notably by Philadelphia Phillies fans.
 The Mess - Used by detractors.

New York Yankees

The Yanks - Short version of "Yankees".
The Pinstripes - Reference to the team's pinstriped uniforms.
The Bronx Bombers - Reference to the team's home, the New York City borough of the Bronx, along with their propensity for hitting "bombs" (home runs).
The Bombers - Short version of the previous.
The Baby Bombers - A description of the relatively young team in 2017 that had much more power than expected and were led by Aaron Judge, a rookie who led the American League with 52 home runs.
The New Yorkers - Reference to New York City, and the publication The New Yorker.
The Damn Yankees - Reference to the play and movie of the same name. Used by detractors around Major League Baseball for winning too many championships.
Murderers' Row - Reference to the championship Yankee teams of the late 1920s, and the first six hitters in the 1927 lineup in particular.
The Stankees - Used by detractors.
The Evil Empire - Used by detractors. Reference to the famous indictment of communism by Ronald Reagan. Coined as a term for the Yankees by Red Sox executive Larry Lucchino after the Yankees got rights to deal with José Contreras. The term has been embraced by many Yankees fans.
The Bronx Zoo - Used by detractors. Reference to the team and the Bronx's turbulent times in the late 1970s, and also the name of a book written by former Yankees pitcher Sparky Lyle about the team's 1978 season. Still used sometimes to describe the organization and stadium. The term has been embraced by many Yankees fans.

Oakland Athletics

Mackmen (when the team played in Philadelphia) - in reference to their manager, Connie Mack.
The A's - Short version of "Athletics". Emphasized by Charles O. Finley during his ownership of the team during the 1960s and 1970s.  Perhaps the most commonly used nickname on this list.
The Green and Gold - Reference to the current team's colors.
The Swingin' A's - Refers to the early 1970s championship teams.
The Big Green Machine - Based from the Big Red Machine of Cincinnati Reds, which is another team that dominated in the '70s.
The White Elephants - Reference to their mascot, which is itself a defiant reference to a comment made by Hall of Fame manager John McGraw, calling the team a "white elephant".
The Elephants - Short version of the previous.
The Oakland Triple-A's (AAAs) - In reference to Triple-A Minor League Baseball, used by some to highlight their lack of competitive skill or poor play during rough years.

Philadelphia Phillies
The Phils - Short version of "Phillies".
The Fightin' Phils - Reference to their hard-nosed style of play. (Some Phillies fans will add "Ph" instead of an "F" for most anything associated with the Phillies, such as "The Phightin' Phils").
The Phightin's - Short version of the previous.
The Phiwwies -  In imitation of the Philadelphia accent.
The Foitin' Phiws - Another version of above.
Phillie Phanatics - Avid followers.
The Red Pinstripes - Reference to the team's red pinstriped uniforms.
The Quaker City Team
The Whiz Kids - Name for the 1950 NL Championship team. Reference to their youth.
The Wheeze Kids - Name for the 1983 NL Championship team. Reference to their lack of youth.
The Broad Street Bellies - Reference to the 1993 NL Championship team for their lack of physical fitness, and the nickname of the NHL's nearby Philadelphia Flyers, the "Broad Street Bullies".
Macho Row - Reference to 1993 NL Championship team.
The Cardiac Kids - Originally a 1950s nickname, better known as the nickname of the 1980 World Championship team.
The Pillies - Reference to an amphetamine scandal in the early 1980s.
The Philthies - Used by detractors.
The Sillies - Used by detractors, especially when team is underperforming.
The Frillies - Used by detractors.

Pittsburgh Pirates

The Bucs - Shortened from buccaneers.
The Buccos - Most frequently used nickname, also shortened from "buccaneers."
The Buccaneers - Long version of shortened versions the previous; a synonym for "pirates."
The Black and Gold - Reference to the team's colors.
The Family - Name adopted during the 1979 World Series Championship season. Derived from the Sister Sledge song "We Are Family", which had become the team's theme song. Sometimes stylized as "Fam-a-lee".

San Diego Padres

The Pads - Short version of "Padres". Pronounced "Pods."
The Friars - Reference to Spanish Franciscan friars, who founded San Diego in 1769.
The Swinging Friars - Variation of the previous. Reference to the "friar swinging a baseball bat" logo used on and off by the team. Also a mascot of the San Diego Padres.
The Chaplains - Nickname during the Pacific Coast League days throughout the World War II and the Korean War era, referencing the title "Padre" given to military chaplains.
The Dads - A mistranslation of the word padres.
The Say May Kids - Nickname given by ex-Padre announcer Matt Vasgersian, referring to the team playing great in May for consecutive years.
Friar Faithful - Spin on "Friars" and the 1998 Padres' "Keep the Faith" campaign to drum up local support for the National League pennant-winning team.
The Pesky Padres - Nickname given in San Francisco Giants official program for their game in San Francisco on July 7, 2011. Refers to the Padres' recent success against the Giants despite generally finishing behind them in the NL West standings, especially their 12–6 record against San Francisco in 2010; the Giants were forced to win a regular-season tie-breaking game to enter the playoffs and eventually won the World Series.
Slam Diego Padres - Nickname given during the 2020 season in regards to the Padres' record four-game streak with a grand slam.
The Boys in Brown - In reference to the team's colors.

San Francisco Giants

The Gints (rhymes with "pints", not "mints") - Short version of "Giants".
The Jints - Alternative version of the previous.
The G-Men - Reference to nickname for a government agent. Also used for the American football team with whom the baseball club used to share a name and a home stadium, the New York Giants.
Los Gigantes - Spanish for Giants. Used on the team's uniform on Cinco de Mayo of 2007.
The Gyros
The Orange and Black - Reference to the team's colors.
The G's - Simple
The Orange Nation - Same as previous and next.
The Orange Giants - Reference to their orange uniforms.
The Boys from the Bay - Same reason as next.
The Bay Bombers - Geographic nickname, alluding to San Francisco, which is situated by the SF Bay.
 The Pacific Sock Exchange The late 1980s early 1990's Giants duo of Will Clark and Kevin Mitchell

Seattle Mariners

The M's - Reference to the first letter in "Mariners".
Los Marineros - Spanish language name for the team.
Los Bomberos – Mariners 2022 season bullpen named in reference to the Spanish translation of the firemen.

St. Louis Cardinals

The Cards - Short version of "Cardinals".
The Redbirds - Reference to the cardinal, which is a red bird. Name of the Cardinals' Triple-A affiliate Memphis Redbirds.
The Birds - Reference to the cardinal, which is a bird.
The Birds on the Bat - Reference to the longtime logo on the front of the uniform jersey.
The Dirty Birds - Derisive term used mostly by Met fans in the '80s. 
The Gashouse Gang - Name for the 1934 World Championship team. Reference to their shabby appearance and rough tactics.
The Runnin' Redbirds - Name for the 1980s Cardinals. Reference to their speed and small-ball tactics.
El Birdos - Nickname given to the 1967 World Series Champion Cardinals team by Orlando Cepeda. Reference to the small Hispanic population of St. Louis, as 'El' is "the" in Spanish and 'Birdos' meant "Birds".
The Rally Birds - Reference to the Cardinals being the top underdog team in 2011 after they're down 10½ games in NL Wild Card standings on August 25 and came back and won the Wild Card and their 11th World Series title via couple of late rallies in WS Game 6.
The Rally Cards - Same as the previous.
The Cardnals - A common pronunciation when "Cardinals" is fluently spoken.
The Birdinals - Portmanteau of "bird" and "cardinal".
The Birdnals - Same as the previous, based from the same reason as two above.
The Fantastic Five - Nickname given to the 1980s Cardinals. Reference to the five players who won three pennants in the 1980s.
The Hardcore Cardinals - Nickname given to the 1980s Cardinals.

Tampa Bay Rays

The Rays - A popular shortened version of the original "Devil Rays" nickname which became the current nickname (that now suggests "rays" of Florida sunshine as well as the fish).
The D-Rays - A shortened version of the team's original nickname, the "Devil Rays". Some media outlets have stated that they will continue to use the now obsolete moniker.
The Manta Rays - Referencing to their Devil Rays' logo.
The Mantas - Short version of the previous.
The Eagle Rays - Referencing that manta rays and devil rays are eagle rays.
The Devil Dogs - Fan-friendly nickname.

Texas Rangers
The Nats - Historical only as the Washington Senators, continued from the previous Washington Senators although the Rangers were never known as the Nationals.
The Strangers - Reference to their traditional losing seasons (the team did not make the playoffs until 1996, 25 years after relocating to the Dallas-Fort Worth Metroplex, and even with recent success has historically been one of MLB's weakest franchises)
The Power Rangers - Reference to their slugging years from the late 1990s to early 2010s.
The Lone Stars - Reference to Texas's nickname, the "Lone Star State". This team nickname has been rarely used in recent years.
The Rags - Used by detractors, mainly Astros fans.
South Oklahoma Rangers - Astros insult for the Rangers having "Texas" in their name when they're located in a small town that's close to the Oklahoman border.

Toronto Blue Jays

The Jays - Short version of "Blue Jays".
The Blue Birds - Another name due to their mascot being a Blue Jay.
The Birds - Reference to jays, which are birds.
The Blue Hyays - The popular Spanish pronunciation of the Blue Jays.
The Blow Jays - Used when they are playing terribly.
The BJ's - Shorter version of "Blue Jays".
The Who Theys - Used by detractors.

Washington Nationals
Natspos - The combination of Nationals and Expos.
The Nats - Short version of "Nationals". Revived from its prior use for the Washington Nationals/Senators (Minnesota Twins) and Washington Senators (Texas Rangers).
The Nasty Nats - Refers to the team playing terribly for few years after moving to Washington in 2005.
The Natsies - Affectionate derivative of Nats.
 Fighters – Reference to the Nationals winning the World Series in 2019 after starting the season 19-31 and winning all five games in the postseason when facing elimination. They trailed in all five of those contests.
 Fightin' Nats – Same as above.
Walk-Off City - Refers to the 2014 win streak where many of the games came via walk-offs.
The  - Derisive. Came about due to an instance of misspelling on team uniforms.
The Trashionals - Used by detractors, mainly Mets and Orioles fans.
 The Walgreens - A reference to the Nationals' logo appearing very similar to the logo of the store Walgreens. Used by detractors.

See also 

 Lists of nicknames – nickname list articles on Wikipedia
 Nicknames: Sports clubs and their nicknames

Notes

External links
 Gmelch, George, "What's in a Baseball Nickname", NINE: A Journal of Baseball History and Culture Volume 14, Number 2, Spring 2006, pp. 129–132. 
 Baseball Nicknames: A Dictionary of Origins and Meanings, by James K. Skipper, McFarland & Company, 1992, 
 Official Major League Baseball history of American League nicknames
 Official Major League Baseball history of National League nicknames
 Chris Berman bestowed nicknames (or Bermanisms): 

Team Nicknames
Nicknames
Baseball teams